The Final Reunion is a live DVD release of the Cliff Richard & the Shadows' performance at the O2 Arena in London. It was released worldwide on 9 November 2009 and was part of The Final Reunion Tour. It debuted at No. 1 on the UK music DVD chart and peaked at No. 7 on the general DVD chart. It also reached No. 1 in several European countries including Sweden, the Netherlands, and Denmark.

Charts

References

Cliff Richard albums
2009 live albums
2009 video albums
Live video albums